St. Matthew was a church in the old town of Leipzig. During its history it had several names and functions. As a church of the Franciscan order, built in 1488, it was known as Barfüßerkirche and Heiliggeistkirche. It served as a Lutheran church, known as Neukirche, from 1699. A new congregation formed in 1876 and named the church Matthäikirche (St. Matthew). The building was destroyed in a bombing in 1943.

Franciscan church 
The church was built from 1488 for the Franciscan order Barfüßer ("Barefeet") and known as the Barfüßerkirche. It enlarged earlier church buildings dating back to the 1230s. It was dedicated in 1502 to the Holy Spirit and therefore also called Franziskanerkirche zum Heiligen Geist and Heiliggeistkirche. After the Reformation, the building served as storage for merchandise from 1552 to 1699.

Neukirche 
The church was remodeled in 1699 in Baroque style as the fourth Lutheran church in Leipzig, known as Neukirche or Neue Kirche (New church). The church was dedicated on 24 September 1699. Georg Philipp Telemann was the musical director from 1704, succeeded by Melchior Hoffmann in June 1705, and from 1720 by Georg Balthasar Schott. From 1723, the church music was supervised by the Thomaskantor (director of church music in Leipzig), then Johann Sebastian Bach, with the third choir of the Thomanerchor singing, while the first choirs performed in the main churches Thomaskirche (St. Thomas) and Nikolaikirche (St. Nicholas).

The building served as a prison in 1806 during the War of the Fourth Coalition, and from 1813 as a hospital.

Matthäikirche 

The church was destroyed in a bombing on 4 December 1943.

References

Bibliography 

 
 
 
 
 
 
 

 
 
 Kirchen in Leipzig. Schriften des Leipziger Geschichtsvereins 2/1993. Sax-Verlag, Beucha 1993
 Heinrich Magirius (u.a.). Stadt Leipzig. Die Sakralbauten. Mit einem Überblick über die städtebauliche Entwicklung von den Anfängen bis 1989. vol 1. Dt. Kunstverlag, München 1995, p. 679-697

External links 

 Johann Sebastian Bachs Wirkungsstätten in Leipzig / Matthäikirche (Neukirche) Paulinerkirche

Churches in Leipzig
Leipzig Matthew
Leipzig Matthew
Leipzig Matthew
Leipzig Matthew
Buildings and structures demolished in 1943
Buildings and structures in Germany destroyed during World War II